"No More Mr. Nice Guy" is a song by American rock band Alice Cooper, released in 1973 as a single off their sixth studio album Billion Dollar Babies (1973). The single reached No. 25 on the US charts and No. 10 on the UK charts, and helped Billion Dollar Babies to reach No. 1 in both the UK and the US. The song was written by Michael Bruce and Alice Cooper.

Cooper wrote the song lyrics about the reactions of his mother's church group to his stage performances, saying that there were worse things that he could do with his life, and that the "gloves were off now."

The song was re-recorded and featured in the video game Guitar Hero: Warriors of Rock, The Simpsons episode "Love Is a Many Strangled Thing", and the Family Guy episode "Mom's the Word".

The song was used in the TV show Ash vs Evil Dead and in the film Dazed and Confused. The scene featuring the song in the latter film was later parodied on Family Guy in the episode "Jungle Love". Cooper made a cameo appearance while performing the song in the film adaptation of the TV series Dark Shadows.

The song has since remained a live staple and one of the band's most popular songs and a classic rock radio staple.

Track listing
"No More Mr. Nice Guy" - 3:06
"Raped and Freezin'" - 3:19

Album appearances
Billion Dollar Babies
A Fistful of Alice
Alice Cooper: Brutally Live
Live at Montreux
Alice Cooper's Greatest Hits
The Beast of Alice Cooper
Classicks (Live Version)
The Life and Crimes of Alice Cooper
Mascara and Monsters: The Best of Alice Cooper
The Definitive Alice Cooper
The Essentials: Alice Cooper
School's Out and Other Hits

Charts

Personnel
Alice Cooper - vocals
Glen Buxton - lead guitar
Michael Bruce - rhythm guitar
Dennis Dunaway - bass
Neal Smith - drums

Megadeth version

American thrash metal band Megadeth covered the song in 1989 for the horror film Shocker. The cover was released as a single in January 1990, charting in both Ireland and the U.K.

The cover was later featured on the band's 1995 B-sides compilation, Hidden Treasures, and the 2007 box set Warchest.

Track listing

Chart positions

Personnel 
Credits are adapted from the liner notes.

Megadeth

Dave Mustaine – guitars, lead vocals
David Ellefson – bass, backing vocals
Nick Menza – drums

Production

Production: Desmond Child and Dave Mustaine

Other cover versions

Pat Boone performed it on the cover album In a Metal Mood: No More Mr. Nice Guy.

Roger Daltrey, Slash, Bob Kulick, Mike Inez, Carmine Appice and David Glen Eisley covered it on the 1999 tribute album Humanary Stew: A Tribute to Alice Cooper.

Uses in popular culture
In 1976, professional wrestler Chris Colt used the song as his entrance theme for his short-lived character The Chris Colt Experience, which was one of the first uses of rock music for a wrestler's theme song. Professional wrestling icon Jim Cornette used the song as the intro and outro for his two podcasts (The Jim Cornette Experience and Drive Thru) until late 2019.

On the fourth episode of the seventh season of the television show Agents of S.H.I.E.L.D. named "Out of the Past", the song's chorus is played as the characters try to figure out what year they traveled to.

References

Alice Cooper songs
Megadeth songs
1973 singles
Songs written by Alice Cooper
Song recordings produced by Bob Ezrin
Warner Records singles
American power pop songs